The Philippine House Committee on Muslim Affairs, or House Muslim Affairs Committee is a standing committee of the Philippine House of Representatives.

Jurisdiction 
As prescribed by House Rules, the committee's jurisdiction is on Muslim affairs which includes the following:
 Development of predominantly Muslim areas
 Welfare of Muslim Filipinos

Members, 18th Congress

See also 
 House of Representatives of the Philippines
 List of Philippine House of Representatives committees
 National Commission on Muslim Filipinos

References

External links 
House of Representatives of the Philippines

Muslim Affairs
Islam in the Philippines